The Didube Pantheon is a cemetery in Tbilisi, Georgia, where some of the most prominent writers, artists, scholars, scientists and political activists of Georgia are buried. These include Zurab Zhvania (1963–2005), who served as Prime Minister of Georgia in 2004. The cemetery was opened in 1939. The pantheon is located in the Didube District.

See also 
 Mtatsminda Pantheon
 Saburtalo Pantheon
 List of cemeteries in Georgia (country)

External links
 

Cemeteries in Georgia (country)
Monuments and memorials in Tbilisi
1930s establishments in Georgia (country)
1939 establishments in the Soviet Union